Kalīla wa-Dimna or Kelileh va demneh is a collection of fables. The book consists of fifteen chapters containing a lot of fables whose heroes are animals. A remarkable animal character is the lion, who plays the role of the king; he has a servant ox Shetrebah, while the two jackals of the title, Kalila and Dimna, appear both as narrators and as protagonists. Its likely origin is the Sanskrit Panchatantra. The book has been translated into many languages, with surviving illustrations in manuscripts from the 13th century onwards.

Origins 

The book is based on the c. 200 BC Sanskrit text Pañcatantra. It was translated into old Persian in the sixth century. It was translated into Arabic in the eighth century. King Vakhtang VI of Kartli made a translation from Persian to Georgian in the 18th century. His work, later edited by his mentor Sulkhan-Saba Orbeliani, has been used as a reference while determining the possible original text, along with an earlier unfinished translation by King David I of Kakheti.

Synopsis 

The King Dabschelim is visited by the philosopher Bidpai who tells him a collection of stories of anthropomorphised animals with important morals for a King. The stories are in response to requests of parables from Dabschelim and they follow a Russian doll format, with stories interwoven and nested to some depth. There are fifteen main stories, acting as frame stories with many more stories within them. The two jackals, Kalila and Dimna, feature both as narrators of the stories and as protagonists within them. They work in the court of the king, Bankala the lion. Kalila is happy with his lot, whereas Dimna constantly struggles to gain fame. The stories are allegories set in a human social and political context, and in the manner of fables illustrate human life.

Manuscripts 

Manuscripts of the text have for many centuries and translated into different languages contained illustrations to accompany the fables.

Legacy 

Kalila and Dimna is considered a masterpiece of Arabic and world literature. 
In 1480, Johannes Gutenberg published Anton von Pforr's German version, Buch der Beispiele der alten Weisen.  La Fontaine, in the preface to his second collection of Fables, explicitly acknowledged his debt to "the Indian sage Pilpay".
The collection has been adapted in plays, cartoons, and commentary works.

See also 

 Hitopadesa
 Jataka tales

References

External links
 Digitised version of 1354 at the Bodleian Libraries
 Digitised version of 1310 from Bavarian State Library
 Digitised version of 16th/17th century from Bavarian State Library

Medieval Arabic literature
Indian literature
Persian literature
4th-century books
6th-century books
Sanskrit texts
8th-century Arabic books
Fables
Abbasid literature